Desireless is the debut album by Swedish singer Eagle-Eye Cherry, released on 7 October 1997.

The album went platinum in the United States and sold over four million copies worldwide. The singles "Save Tonight" and "Falling in Love Again" were a major part of the album's success. The title track, “Desireless” is a cover of a song by Cherry's father Don Cherry from his album Relativity Suite.

Track listing

Track information adapted from the album's liner notes.

Personnel 
Eagle-Eye Cherry – acoustic guitar, piano, keyboards, vocals
Klas Åhlund – acoustic guitar, electric guitar
Jaya Deva – acoustic guitar, guitar, electric guitar, vocals
Elias Modig – bass
Peter Forss – bass, background vocals
Kent (Gillström) Isaacs – acoustic guitar, electric guitar, producer, songwriter
Lars Halapi – acoustic guitar, electric guitar
Adam Kviman – acoustic guitar, Fender Rhodes
Niklas Medin – organ, Hammond organ
Magnus Persson – percussion, drums, didjeridu, sleigh bells
Bengt Berger – tabla
Mattias Thorell – acoustic guitar, bass, electric guitar
Ingemar Woody – electric guitar
Sebastian Oberg – cello
Goran Kajfes – trumpet
Titiyo Jah – vocals
Vinia Mojica – background vocals
Sharon Dyall – background vocals
Alisha Zevulon – voices

Charts

Weekly charts

Year-end charts

Certifications

References 

1997 debut albums
Eagle-Eye Cherry albums